Real Illusions: Reflections is the seventh studio album by guitarist Steve Vai, released on February 22, 2005, through Epic Records. The album reached No. 147 on the U.S. Billboard 200, as well as No. 88 on the Dutch albums chart and No. 110 on the French albums chart.

Described by Vai as "rock fable", Real Illusions: Reflections is the first part of a three-part concept album about a town visited by the godsent Pamposh and his construction of the Church. "Lotus Feet", purposely designated as track seven (see The Seventh Song) and recorded live during three separate concerts in the Netherlands during Vai's 2004 "Aching Hunger Tour", was nominated for Best Rock Instrumental Performance at the 2006 Grammy Awards. Vai cites Bulgarian wedding music as having inspired "Freak Show Excess".

Critical reception

Sean Westergaard at AllMusic gave Real Illusions: Reflections four stars out of five, listing "K'm-Pee-Du-Wee", "Firewall", "Yai Yai", "Freak Show Excess" and "Lotus Feet" as highlights. He also remarked favorably about Vai's singing: "As a vocalist, he's gotten way more confident, and while it's doubtful his singing will ever be the primary attraction, he does a fine job here."

Track listing

Personnel

Steve Vai – lead vocals, guitar, all instrumentation (except where noted), engineering, mixing, production
Jeremy Colson – drums, percussion (track 5), additional percussion (tracks 4, 6, 10)
Gregg Bissonette – percussion (track 5), additional percussion (tracks 4, 6, 10)
Billy Sheehan – bass
Bryan Beller – bass (track 7)
Jerry Hey – trumpet (track 5)
Gary Grant – trumpet (track 5)
Dan Higgins – saxophone (track 5)
Larry Williams – saxophone (track 5)
Bill Reichenbach, Jr. – trombone (track 5)
Charlie Loper – trombone (track 5)
Stacy Ellis – background vocals (track 5)
Metropole Orkest – orchestra (track 7)
Chris Opperman – piano (track 7)
Pia Vai – harp (track 11)
Fire Vai – spoken vocals (track 11)
Laurel Fishman – spoken vocals (track 11)
Ruby Birman – spoken vocals (track 11)
Len Birman – spoken vocals (track 11)
Jeff Mallard – spoken vocals (track 11)
Michael Mesker – spoken vocals (track 11)
Thomas Nordegg – spoken vocals (track 11)
David Kole – orchestration (track 7)
Dick Bakker – conducting (track 7)
Neil Citron – engineering assistance
Paul Bliven – engineering assistance
Bernie Grundman – mastering

Chart performance

Awards

References

External links
In Review: Steve Vai "Real Illusions: Reflections" at Guitar Nine Records

Steve Vai albums
2005 albums
Epic Records albums
Concept albums